The 16th Golden Bell Awards was held on 16 May 1981 at the Sun Yat-sen Memorial Hall in Taipei, Taiwan. The ceremony was broadcast by Taiwan Television (TTV).

Winners

References

1981
1981 in Taiwan